Gerald is a male Germanic given name meaning "rule of the spear" from the prefix ger- ("spear") and suffix -wald ("rule"). Variants include the English given name Jerrold, the feminine nickname Jeri and the Welsh language Gerallt and Irish language Gearalt. Gerald is less common as a surname. The name is also found in French as Gérald. Geraldine is the feminine equivalent.

Given name
People with the name Gerald include:

Politicians
 Gerald Boland, Ireland's longest-serving Minister for Justice
 Gerald Ford, 38th President of the United States
 Gerald Gardiner, Baron Gardiner, Lord Chancellor from 1964 to 1970
 Gerald Häfner, German MEP
 Gerald Klug, Austrian politician
 Gerald Lascelles (disambiguation), several people
 Gerald Nabarro, British Conservative politician 
 Gerald S. McGowan, US Ambassador to Portugal
 Gerald Wellesley, 7th Duke of Wellington, British diplomat, soldier, and architect

Sports
 Gerald Asamoah, Ghanaian-born German football player
 Gerald Beverly, American basketball player
 Gerald Brown (American football), American football coach
 Gerald Christian (born 1991), American football player
 Gerald Davies, Welsh rugby player
 Gerald Dockery, American football player
 Gerald Everett, American football player
 Gerald Green, American basketball player
 Gerald Humphries, English cricketer
 Gerald Laird, baseball player
 Gerald Madkins (born 1969), American basketball player and executive
 Gerald Melzer, Austrian tennis player
 Gerald Sensabaugh, American football player
 Gerald Sherry, American football player
 Gerald Wallace, American basketball player
 Gerald Willis (born 1995), American football player

Entertainment
 Gerald Anderson (born 1989), Filipino American actor
 Gerald Casale, vocalist, bass guitar & synthesizer player, Devo
 Gerry Cinnamon (born Gerald Crosbie, 1985), Scottish musician
 Gerald Finzi, British composer
 Gerald Fried (1928–2023), American composer
 Gerald Harper (born 1929), English actor
 Gerald Haslam, American author The Other California
 Gerald Alexander Held, German actor
 Gerald Levert (1966–2006), American R&B singer and songwriter
 Gerald Masters, songwriter and musician
 Gerald McRaney (b. 1947), American actor
 Gérald Neveu (1921-1960), French poet
 Gerald Vizenor, novelist, poet and critic
 Gerald Gillum, American rapper known as "G-Eazy"
 Gerald Wiley, a pseudonym used by British comic actor and writer Ronnie Barker (1929-2005)

Other fields
 Gerald Birks, Canadian World War I fighter ace 
 Giraldus Cambrensis (Gerald of Wales), medieval clergyman and chronicler of his times
 Gerald Cohen (1941–2009), Canadian professor of social and political theory at Oxford University, known as G. A. Cohen
 Gerald Durrell (1925–1995), British naturalist, zookeeper, conservationist, author, and television presenter
 Lady Gerald Fitzalan-Howard, British aristocrat
Gerald Friedland, American academic
 Gerald Murphy, American heir
 Gerald Ratner, British retail tycoon
 Gerald Mayo, filed a lawsuit against Satan and his servants in US District Court
 Gerald Shur (1933-2020), American lawyer, and the founder of the US Federal Witness Protection Program
 Gerald Sparrow (1903–1988), British lawyer, judge and travel writer
 Gerald Templer, British Army officer and military commander
 Gerald C. Thomas, United States Marine Corpsgeneral who served as Assistant Commandant of the Marine Corps
 Gerald Zamponi, Canadian academic

Fictional characters
Gerald Tippett, a character in the New Zealand soap opera Shortland Street
Gerald Robotnik, a character from Sonic Adventure 2
Gerald Broflovski, a character from South Park
Gerald Martin Johanssen, a character from Nickelodeon's Hey Arnold!
 Gerald, a anthropomorphic sea lion in the 2016 computer-animated sequel film Finding Dory
 Gerald McCloy, protagonist in 1950 short film Gerald McBoing-Boing
 Gerald, a character from Little Lotta comics and Harvey Street Kids 
 Gerald O'Hara, Scarlett O'Hara's father in the film Gone with the Wind

Surname
Matt Gerald, American actor and screenwriter

See also
 Geraldine
 Gerad (disambiguation)
 Jerald (name)
 Jerrold
 FitzGerald

References